The George and Dragon is a Grade II listed public house at 151 Cleveland Street, Fitzrovia, London W1T 6QN.

It was built in about 1850.

References

Grade II listed buildings in the London Borough of Camden
Grade II listed pubs in London
Fitzrovia
Pubs in the London Borough of Camden
Saint George and the Dragon